Park Bo-yeon is a South Korean actress. She is known for her roles in dramas such as Find Me if You Can, I Have Not Done My Best Yet and Cheer Up.

Filmography

Television series

Web series

Music video appearances

References

External links 
 
 

2002 births
Living people
21st-century South Korean actresses
South Korean television actresses
South Korean web series actresses